Chorla Ghat is an Indian nature destination, located on the intersection of the borders of the states of Goa, Karnataka, and Maharashtra. The ghat boasts of a few rare species of wild-life such as the barred wolf snake (Lycodon striatus) in its sub-tropical forests.

The Nature Conservation Facility has been established at Chorla Ghat to facilitate research and long term monitoring of the Western Ghats of the Sahyadris region and their biodiversity and is intended at providing a platform for ecologists and wildlife biologists by way of a fully equipped field station for this area.

Places to visit include Twin Vajra Waterfalls and Peak of Lasni Temb.
Activities include: Foot trail, Jungle walks, Treks and hike, Machans and hide.

References

External links

 Chorla Ghat (Tripadvisor)
 Chorla Ghat | The tranquil side of Goa (YouTube)
 Chorla Ghat Road Condition | Belgaum to Goa Ghat | Pune to Goa Road Trip
 Wildernest resort | Chorla Ghat | Goa

Mountain passes of Maharashtra
Mountain passes of the Western Ghats
Mountain passes of Karnataka
Roads in Belgaum district
Geography of Belagavi district
Roads in Goa
Geography of North Goa district
Tourist attractions in Belagavi district